Barter 6 is the debut commercial mixtape by American rapper Young Thug. It was released on April 17, 2015, by 300 Entertainment and Atlantic Records. Barter 6 features guest appearances from Birdman, T.I., Boosie Badazz, Young Dolph, Yak Gotti, Lil Duke, Moussa Assuom and Jacquees, while the production was handled primarily by in-house producers London on da Track and Wheezy, among others. Barter 6 received generally positive reviews and peaked at 22 on the US charts.

Title controversy
The mixtape was initially titled Carter 6, in continuation of the naming sequence of Lil Wayne's successful Tha Carter album series. This created controversy, as Wayne's scheduled album Tha Carter V was repeatedly delayed amid a dispute between himself and Cash Money Records, who had reportedly refused to release the album. Wayne subsequently became involved in legal proceedings against Cash Money and publicly criticized the label's owner (and Thug's mentor) Birdman, as well as responding negatively to Thug's decision to name the album after him. Despite this, Thug claimed that he was not trying to be disrespectful, and that Wayne was his "idol".

Following a threat of legal action, Thug announced days prior to the release that the project was to be re-titled Barter 6, in line with the typical Blood gang practice of replacing the letter "C" with "B". He furthered the ill feeling by announcing his first show to promote the project in Hollygrove, New Orleans, one of the neighborhoods in which Wayne was raised.

Marketing and sales
Barter 6 was released by 300 Entertainment on April 17, 2015, and charted at number 22 on the US Billboard 200, selling 17,000 copies in its first week. The mixtape's lead single, "Check", was released on April 1, 2015, as well an accompanying music video, the song peaked at number 100 on the US Billboard Hot 100.

Critical reception

Barter 6 was met with generally positive reviews. At Metacritic, which assigns a normalized rating out of 100 to reviews from professional publications, the mixtape received an average score of 72, based on 13 reviews. Aggregator AnyDecentMusic? gave it 6.5 out of 10, based on their assessment of the critical consensus.

Complex said "on Barter 6, a rapper frequently dismissed as a druggie dance trapper inverts himself, yielding a passionate and personal record", adding that his "visceral illustrations are one-of-a-kind, and he communicates joy, frustration, and dread with unique clarity". Meaghan Garvey of Pitchfork stated that "Barter 6 feels like a 50-minute performance of what rap, as a form, can do: rap that need not transcend itself, towards High Art on one hand or commercial art on the other, in order to succeed in 2015". Pitchfork later named Barter 6 the 14th best record of 2015 while ranking the mixtape's opening track "Constantly Hating" as the year's sixth best song. HipHopDX called Barter 6 "the definitive mainstream strip club album of the modern era".

In a less enthusiastic review, Spin magazine's Dan Weiss felt Young Thug sounded lazy on Barter 6, "sitting around waiting to ascend to the next level of his sound, for inspiration to strike, though with such a laid-back, inscrutable flow, he might have to activate that change himself". Rolling Stone critic Joe Levy said most of the songs sound "boastful and sad in the same moment", abandoning the frenzied tunefulness of Young Thug's past work in favor of indistinctly "syrupy tracks". Billboard stated that the album "offers cohesion and unity, though maybe at the expense of the exciting, what-will-happen next feel of past mixtapes". Consequence stated that "Barter 6 feels like a step in the right direction rather than a destination, proof that Thugger can put together a complete package even if it's less than adventurous".

Track listing

Sample credits
  "Amazing" contains a sample of "September", written by Alta Willis, Albert McKay, and Maurice White, as performed by Earth, Wind & Fire.

Personnel
Credits adapted from the mixtape's liner notes and Tidal.

 Young Thug – vocals, executive producer
 Joe LaPorta – mastering engineer
 John Horesco – mastering engineer (4)
 Alex Tumay – mixing engineer (1–3, 5–13)
 Miles Walker – mixing engineer (4)

Charts

Weekly charts

Year-end charts

Certifications

References

2015 mixtape albums
Atlantic Records albums
Albums produced by London on da Track
Young Thug albums